Advena is a South African nuclear weapons production facility, having been transferred in 1979 from the Pelindaba nuclear research center to the state-owned Armaments Corporation of South Africa (Armscor), was later developed as the Kentron Circle facility.

Nuclear family
At Pelindaba, Nuclear weapons of the gun-type design were developed. Armscor established a production line there in 1981 and produced at least one nuclear device of a 10-18 kilotons yield each year.

Extended family
Advena Central Laboratories were constructed in the mid-1980s to extend South Africa's nuclear capabilities from gun-type weapons to inter-continental ballistic missile (ICBM) delivery platforms. Work to produce advanced warhead designs was also developed. Working with Israel at Advena, a 2000 km-range missile – based on the Jericho II ICBM – was designed and tested. The construction of Advena was completed at the same time as South Africa's nuclear program was terminated in the lead-up to Nelson Mandela's election in 1994.

See also
South Africa and weapons of mass destruction
Vela incident
History of South Africa in the apartheid era

External links
Advena/Kentron Circle
Blast from the past: Lab scientists receive vindication
"South Africa and the affordable bomb," David Albright, Bulletin of the Atomic Scientists, July 1994.

Military installations of South Africa